Shankar Sarath Kumar (born on 15 December 1991 in Chennai, India) is a professional motorcycle road racer and a national champion in the 125cc class. He currently competes in the Indian National Motorcycle Supersport 165cc Championship, boarding Honda. Sarath began his racing career in 2008 with the Ten10 Racing Team (now the WTR-Ten10 Racing team) and competed in the 125cc class in the 2011 MotoGP.

Education
Kumar completed his secondary schooling at Tamil Nadu Open University in 2008. In February 2010, he attended the California Superbike School, taught by Keith Code at the MMSC Track in Chennai, with his tuition paid by the Madras Motor Sports Club as a way to encourage young talent.

Career
Kumar started racing as a privateer on a TVS Apache 150cc 4-stroke in the "TVS Race a bike scheme class" at the JK Junior Championship and the Summer Cup 2008 and finished second in both races. He joined TVS Racing that same year and won the National Champion title for the year 2008 in the up to 130 cc 4-stroke novice class. He intended to move to the 125cc class in 2011.

Achievements
In 2009, Kumar joined Ten10 Racing India Pvt Ltd during the third round and competed in the up to 165 cc 4-stroke open class, finishing fourth that September. He entered the FIM UAM Indian round of the Asia GP championship as a wildcard entry in the "Honda Stunner" class and finished seventh and eighth.

In January 2010, Kumar won the Indian 4-stroke up to 165cc open class at the MECO Endurance Race, a 90-minute non-stop event, and was adjudged as the best rider of the day. During the MRF International Challenge 2010, Kumar finished first in the Yamaha 135cc one-make under bone class and second in the Group D – 4-stroke up to 165cc open class. In August 2010, Kumar participated in the FIM UAM Asia GP Indian Championship round as a wild card entry in the "Honda Stunner" class and finished fourth and fifth.

Based on his performance during the FIM UAM Asia GP (Indian round), the Federation of Motor Sports Clubs of India offered Kumar a sponsored entry for the Japan round of the UAM championship. He finished seventh and eighth and set the second-fastest lap time at the circuit for his class at 1:54.3.

In 2019, he won the National title in Pro-stock up to 165cc.

Career statistics

By season

By class

Races by year
(key)

References
 "Sarath Kumar the first Indian rider in the World Championship.", Times of India, 24 November 2010. Retrieved 22 December 2010.
 "Sarath Kumar First Indian In Motogp", http://burnyourfuel.com, 27 November 2010. Retrieved 22 December 2010.

1991 births
Motorsport people from Chennai
Living people
Indian motorsport people
125cc World Championship riders